The 1918 Delaware Fightin' Blue Hens football team was an American football team that represented Delaware College (later renamed the University of Delaware) as an independent during the 1918 college football season. In its first and only season under head coach Milton Aronowitz, the team compiled a 1–2–2 record and was outscored by a total of 44 to 19. Harry W. Loose was the team captain. The season was shortened due to travel restrictions resulting from World War I and the 1918 Spanish flu pandemic.

Schedule

References

Delaware
Delaware Fightin' Blue Hens football seasons
Delaware Fightin' Blue Hens football